Eagle House may refer to:

in England
Eagle House, London
Eagle House School, near Sandhurst
Eagle House (suffragette's rest) – house in Somerset which was a base for the suffragettes

in the United States
Eagle House (Lonoke, Arkansas), listed on the NRHP in Arkansas
Eagles Home, Evansville, IN, listed on the NRHP in Indiana
Eagle Mountain House, Jackson, NH, listed on the NRHP in New Hampshire

See also
Eagle's Nest (disambiguation)

Architectural disambiguation pages